Comr. NURUDEEN ADAMU (Mr. Hanson) A National President, Nigerian Universities Accounting Students Association (NUASA NHQ) born on 11 April 1994 from Kwakuti Town, paikoro L.G.A Niger state, An Accountant, Tax Consultant, politician, public figure

Biography 

Weeks is a native of North Carolina but has lived throughout the US working as a professor in major universities. He was born in Morehead, NC and currently resides in the Seattle area with his wife, Nancy.

He earned a Doctor of Philosophy (PhD) in both Clinical Psychology and Family Studies in 1979 from Georgia State University. At Georgia State University, he studied with Luciano L'Abate who is the founder of the field of family psychology and one of the most published psychologists in the world.

Professional career 
Since 1979, Weeks has served in a number of professional positions including: Associate Professor of Psychology at the University of North Carolina, Program Director at Council for Relationships, and later Clinical Associate Professor of Psychology at the University of Pennsylvania School of Medicine. He also served as President of the American Board of Family Psychology in 1988 and 1989.

He was Professor and chair for the Marriage and Family Therapy Program at the University of Nevada, Las Vegas from 1999 to 2013. In 2013, he became a professor in the program.

His development of the Intersystem Approach to therapy (see Weeks & Hof, 1994) has been one of his major achievements. It is a theoretical framework which combines individual, couple, and intergenerational factors in the diagnosis and treatment of individuals, couples, and families. Several books have been published demonstrating its application in couples and sex therapy. This theory is designed to fit the therapy to clients rather than forcing clients to conform to the therapist's theoretical framework.

The Intersystem Approach is an integrative and dialectical framework, that explores how individuals, couples, family systems and communities function in their relationships. it includes two constructs: (1) the attachment theory construct, and (2) the interactional construct. Gerald R. Weeks. Klaus F. Riegel asserted that development proceeds in four dimensions simultaneously: 1) inner-biological, 2) individual-psychological, 3) cultural-sociological, and 4) outer-physical. The approach uses genograms (a graphic representation of an intergenerational family tree that displays the interactions of families through multiple generations). Within genograms, clinicians can develop maps and timelines for each of the four domains, and an Internal Models Map (IMM).

Early in his career he was influential in the development of strategic therapy. His book on paradoxical psychotherapy was one of the top selling professional books in the field of psychotherapy.

In addition to being a professor and author of many advanced professional books, he has lectured and trained clinicians throughout the world. He began providing training to clinicians in Turkey in 2011 and today there are 2,000 therapists in the country who are practising his approach to couple and sex therapy.

Clinical background and experience 

Weeks received his doctorate in psychology with specializations in both Clinical Psychology and Family Psychology (couple and family therapy). In fact, he was the second psychologist in the U.S. to receive a doctorate with a specialization in Family Psychology. His clinical mentor was Luciano L’Abate who is the founder of the field of Family Psychology. Further, Dr. Weeks holds every advanced certification and board certification one can obtain in the fields of couple and sex therapy: Clinical Fellow; Certified Sex Therapist and Supervisor; Diplomate (Board Certified), American Board of Sexology, American Board of Couple and Family Psychology.

His areas of specialization for the past 35 years have been individual and couple relational issues as well as sex therapy. He has written numerous professional texts and has provided over 30,000 hours of couple/sex therapy. In 1985, he became the youngest director of training at the Marriage Council of Philadelphia (currently called the Council for Relationships)/Division of Family Studies, University of Pennsylvania School of Medicine. Marriage Council was the birthplace of couple therapy and has been in continuous operation since 1932. As the director of a post-master's program, he was responsible for training over 300 clinicians in advanced principles of couple therapy. He also founded the Institute for Sex Therapy during his tenure at PENN.

Weeks is the founder of the systemic approach to sex therapy and the Intersystem Approach to Therapy. Both approaches propose that problems must be conceptualized within the context in which they occur from the broadest possible perspective. He focuses on factors that contribute to problems which include medical/drug induced effects, individual/psychological issues, couple dysfunction, and the effect of the family-of-origin. A systematically organized integrative plan of treatment is then developed. In addition, he believes that therapy should be about more than just solving the immediate problem, but strive to produce optimal functioning.

Recognition 
He received the American Association for Marriage and Family Therapy "Outstanding Contribution to the Field of Marriage and Family Therapy" award in 2009 and "The 2010 Family psychologist of the year" award from the Society for Family Psychology, which is part of the American Psychological Association.

Publications 
Besides his books, Weeks has published scientific journal articles and book chapters. He has also presented hundreds of scientific papers, lectures, and training workshops throughout North America, Europe, and Australia. Several of his books are widely used to train students in masters and doctoral programs in couple and family therapy.

Author or co-author 
Hertlein, K. M., Weeks, G., & Gambescia, N. (Eds.) (2019). Systemic Sex Therapy. (3rd ed.). New York: Routledge.
Weeks, G. & Gambescia, N. (2016). A clinician's guide to systemic sex therapy. (2nd ed.). New York: Routledge 
Weeks, G, Fife, S, Peterson, C. (2016). Techniques for the couple therapist. New York: Routledge. 
Hertlein, K. M., Weeks, G., & Gambescia, N. (Eds.) (2015). Systemic Sex Therapy. (2nd ed.). New York: Routledge.
Weeks, G. R., & Fife, S. (2014). Couples in treatment. ( 3rd ed.). New York: Routledge. 
Hertlein, K, Weeks, G., & Sendak, S. (2009). A clinician's guide to systemic sex therapy. New York: Routledge.
Weeks, G, Odell, M., & Methven, S. (2005). Common mistakes in couple therapy. W. W. Norton. 
Sexton, T., Weeks, G., & Robbins, M. (2003). Handbook of family therapy. New York: Brunner/Routledge. 
Weeks, G., Gambescia, N., & Jenkins, R. (2003). Treating infidelity. New York: W.W. Norton. 
Weeks, G., & Gambescia, N. (2002). Hypoactive sexual desire: Integrating couple and sex therapy. New York: W.W. Norton.                                                                                                                                                                                                        
Weeks, G., & Gambescia, N. (2000). Erectile dysfunction: Integrating couple therapy, sex therapy and medical treatment. Dunmore, PA: W.W. Norton. 
DeMaria, R., Weeks, G., & Hof, L. (1999). Focused genograms. New York: Brunner/Mazel.
Weeks, G. & Hof, L. (1995). Integrative solutions: Treating common problems in couples' therapy.  New York:  Brunner/Mazel. 
Sauber, R., L'Abate, L., Weeks, G., & Buchanan, W. (1993). Dictionary of family psychology and therapy.  Newbury Park, CA: Sage.
Weeks, G. & Treat, S. (1992). Couples in treatment. New York: Brunner Mazel.  (Also translated into Italian and Chinese.); revised ed., 2001. 
Sauber, R., L'Abate, L., & Weeks, G. (1985). Family therapy: Basic concepts and terms. Rockville, MD: Aspen Systems.
Weeks, G., & L'Abate, L. (1982). Paradoxical psychotherapy: Theory and practice with individuals, couples, and families. New York: Brunner/Mazel. (translated into Japanese, German, Italian, Polish, Chinese, Finnish, and Turkish.)  Main Selection of the Psychotherapy Book Club, 1982.

Editor or co-editor 
Weeks, G. & Hof, L., (Eds.) (1994). The marital-relationship therapy casebook:  Theory and application of the intersystem model.  New York:  Brunner/Mazel.
Weeks, G. (Ed.) (1989). Treating couples: The intersystem model of the Marriage Council of Philadelphia.  New York: Brunner/Mazel. 
Weeks, G. & Hof, L. (Eds.) (1987). Integrating sex and marital therapy: A clinician's guide. New York: Brunner/Mazel.  Main selection of Psychotherapy and Social Science Review Book Club. 
Weeks G. (Ed.) (1985). Promoting change through paradoxical therapy.  Homewood, IL: Dow-Jones. Rev. ed, 1991.

References

External links 
Personal Web Page

Year of birth missing (living people)
Living people
21st-century American psychologists
Georgia State University alumni
University of Nevada, Las Vegas faculty
People from Morehead City, North Carolina